Arasur is a census town and a suburb in Coimbatore district in the Indian state of Tamil Nadu.

See also
 Coimbatore metropolitan area

References 

Cities and towns in Coimbatore district
Suburbs of Coimbatore